The 1977 Family Circle Cup was a women's tennis tournament played on outdoor clay courts at the Sea Pines Plantation on Hilton Head Island, South Carolina in the United States. The event was part of the AAA category of the 1977 Colgate Series.  It was the fifth edition of the tournament and was held from March 28 through April 3, 1977. First-seeded Chris Evert won the singles title, her fourth consecutive title at the event, and earned $25,000 first-prize money.

Finals

Singles

 Chris Evert defeated  Billie Jean King 6–0, 6–1
 It was Evert's 7th title of the year and the 74th of her career.

Doubles
 Rosemary Casals /  Chris Evert defeated  Françoise Dürr /  Virginia Wade 1–6, 6–2, 6–3

Prize money

Notes

References

External links
 Women's Tennis Association (WTA) tournament details
 International Tennis Federation (ITF) tournament edition details

Family Circle Cup
Family Circle Cup
Charleston Open
Family Circle Cup
Family Circle Cup
Family Circle Cup